The 2018 Stetson Hatters football team represented Stetson University during the 2018 NCAA Division I FCS football season. They were led by sixth-year head coach Roger Hughes and played their home games at Spec Martin Stadium. They were members of the Pioneer Football League. They finished the season 8–2, 6–2 in PFL play to finish in a tie for second place.

Previous season
The Hatters finished the 2017 season 2–9, 1–7 in PFL play to finish in tenth place.

Preseason

Preseason All-PFL team
The PFL released their preseason all-PFL team on July 30, 2018, with the Hatters having one player selected.

Defense

JJ Henderson – DB

Preseason coaches poll
The PFL released their preseason coaches poll on July 31, 2018, with the Hatters predicted to finish in ninth place.

Schedule

Source:

Game summaries

Point

Waldorf

Marist

at San Diego

at Drake

Jacksonville

at Davidson

Morehead State

at Butler

Valparaiso

References

Stetson
Stetson Hatters football seasons
Stetson Hatters football